Jüdischer Friedhof Deutz is a cemetery in Cologne, Germany. Founded in 1695, it is the oldest Jewish cemetery in the district of Cologne. Last burial took place during the Second World War in 1941.

References

External links
 

Deutz
Deutz